Reese Stalder (born 12 November 1996) is an American tennis player.

Stalder has a career high ATP singles ranking of No. 956 achieved on 28 June 2021. He also has a career high doubles ranking of No. 108 achieved on 6 March 2023.

He has won 3 ATP Challenger doubles titles. Stalder played college tennis at Texas Christian University.

Career
He won his maiden Challenger doubles title at the 2021 Puerto Vallarta Open with Gijs Brouwer.

He made his ATP doubles debut at the 2023 Delray Beach Open where he reached the semifinals partnering 2023 Australian Open winner Rinky Hijikata and defeating second seeded pair of Jamie Murray and Michael Venus in the quarterfinals. He reached the final defeating Mexican duo Hans Hach Verdugo and Miguel Ángel Reyes-Varela. As a result he moved into the top 110 at a new career high on 20 February 2023.

ATP career finals

Doubles: 1 (1 runner-up)

Challenger and Future Finals

Doubles 17 (10 titles, 7 runner-ups)

References

External links
 
 

1996 births
Living people
American male tennis players
Sportspeople from Newport Beach, California
People from Costa Mesa, California
TCU Horned Frogs men's tennis players
Tennis people from California